Ntokozo "Schillo" Tshuma (born September 21, 1992) is a Zimbabwean footballer.

Career
On January 16, 2014, Tshuma was drafted 17th overall in the 2014 MLS SuperDraft by the Portland Timbers.  Two months later, he was loaned out to USL Pro club Orange County Blues FC.  He made his professional debut on April 5 in 2-0 loss to Oklahoma City Energy FC. On July 20, 2015, Tshuma was waived from the Portland Timbers 

On March 25, 2016, USL club Saint Louis FC announced their signing of Tshuma.

References

External links

Maryland Terrapins bio

1992 births
Living people
Zimbabwean footballers
Zimbabwean expatriate footballers
Maryland Terrapins men's soccer players
Portland Timbers players
Orange County SC players
Phoenix Rising FC players
Portland Timbers 2 players
Saint Louis FC players
Sportspeople from Bulawayo
Association football forwards
Expatriate soccer players in the United States
Portland Timbers draft picks
USL Championship players